Tom Tilley may refer to:
 Tom Tilley (ice hockey)
 Tom Tilley (television presenter)